Demirtepe can refer to:

 Demirtepe, Gelibolu
 Demirtepe, Karakoçan